Hannes Zehentner (born 6 July 1965 in Rosenheim) is a German former alpine skier who competed in the 1988 Winter Olympics.

External links
 sports-reference.com
 

1965 births
Living people
German male alpine skiers
Olympic alpine skiers of West Germany
Alpine skiers at the 1988 Winter Olympics
People from Rosenheim
Sportspeople from Upper Bavaria
20th-century German people